Agent Fresco are an Icelandic band that combines pop, alternative, art, metal, and math rock. They formed in 2008, just weeks prior to winning the M%C3%BAs%C3%ADktilraunir. Their first release was the EP Lightbulb Universe, which won at the Kraumur Awards.

The lead singer is Arnór Dan Arnarson. Vignir Rafn Hilmarsson plays bass guitar as well as the electric upright bass, Hrafnkell Örn Guðjónsson plays the drums, and Þórarinn Guðnason plays the guitar and piano/keyboards.

In late 2010, Agent Fresco released their first full-length album, A Long Time Listening. Destrier, their second full-length album, followed on 7 August 2015.

Awards
Agent Fresco won a Kraumur Award for their debut EP Lightbulb Universe.

In 2009 they were named best new artist at the Icelandic Music Awards.

They won Rock Album of the Year in 2016 for Destrier, with Arnór Dan also winning Male Singer of the Year.

Band members
 Arnór Dan Arnarson – vocals, keyboards
 Þórarinn Guðnason – guitar, piano, programming
 Vignir Rafn Hilmarsson – bass, upright bass
 Hrafnkell Örn Guðjónsson – drums, percussion

Discography

Albums
 A Long Time Listening (2010)
 Destrier (2015)

EPs
 Lightbulb Universe (2008)

Singles
 "Eyes of a Cloud Catcher" (2008)
 "Translations" (2010)
 "A Long Time Listening" (2011)
 "Dark Water" (2014)
 "See Hell" (2015)
 "Wait For Me" (2015)
 "Howls" (2015)

Miscellaneous
Arnór Dan Arnarson was featured on several songs on the soundtrack for the 2014 TV Anime Terror in Resonance. He contributed vocals on four tracks of the 2013 Ólafur Arnalds album For Now I Am Winter, and in 2015 he sang on two songs ("So Close", "So Far") of the Broadchurch soundtrack, also composed by Arnalds.
In 2018, Arnarson released his debut solo single, titled "Stone by Stone".

References 

Icelandic progressive rock groups
Long Branch Records artists
Musical groups established in 2008
Musical groups from Reykjavík